Borgese is an Italian surname. Notable people with the surname include:

Alessandro Borgese (born 1985), Italian footballer
Elisabeth Mann Borgese, CM (1918–2002), German-born Canadian writer and environmentalist
Giuseppe Antonio Borgese (1882–1952), Italian writer, journalist and literary critic
Sal Borgese (born 1937), Italian actor

Italian-language surnames